Asa Stevens (born November 27, 2000) is an American professional boxer. As an amateur he won gold medals at the 2018 Youth World Championships and 2019 U.S. National Golden Gloves.

Professional boxing record

References

External links

Asa Stevens' profile from Team USA

Living people
2000 births
American male boxers
Boxers from Hawaii
Flyweight boxers
Bantamweight boxers
Southpaw boxers
People from Honolulu County, Hawaii
Youth and Junior World Boxing Championships medalists
National Golden Gloves champions